Anderswelt is the sixth album released by the German Medieval folk rock band Schandmaul on 4 April 2008. It was recorded from October 2007 to January 2007 at Turnstyle Studio, Berlin, and the HOFA Studios in Karlsdorf and was produced by Thomas Heimann-Trosien. The album contains 14 tracks, including an instrumental, "Fiddlefolkpunk". Thematically, the album focusses on creatures of mythology like sirens ("Sirenen"), werewolves ("Wolfsmensch") and spirits (as in "Stunde des Lichts"). The track "Drei Lieder" (Three Songs) tells of a young bard who participates in a singers' competition to take revenge on the prince who once destroyed his native village and killed his only brother. "Die Königin" (The Queen) is about a bewitched woman who was once good-natured but has been turned into a dragon. The track "Anderswelt"(Other-world) deals with mysterious sightings of figures from the Other-world who were spotted near a Celtic shrine.

Reception
The album remained in the German Longplay Charts for fifteen weeks, peaking at #8, in the Austrian charts for 3 weeks, peaking at #43 and in the Swiss charts for 2 weeks, peaking at #44. The Austrian webzine Stormbringer lauded the album's diversity and balance and rated it five stars out of five. The German Sonic Seducer magazine wrote that the general tone of Anderswelt was more positive and brighter than that of Schandmaul's prior album Mit Leib und Seele.

Track listing

Personnel
Musicians
 Matthias Richter – electric bass, double bass
 Birgit Muggenthaler-Schmack – bagpipes, flutes, shawm, vocals
 Stefan Brunner – drums, percussion, vocals
 Anna Kränzlein – violin, viola, hurdy-gurdy, vocals
 Martin Duckstein – electric guitar, classical guitar, vocals
 Thomas Lindner – lead vocals, acoustic guitar

Guest musicians
 Benni Cellini (Letzte Instanz) - cello on "Krieger", "Königin", "Die Braut", "Augen auf!" and "Prinzessin"

Production
 Thomas Heiman-Trosien – mixing, mastering
 Thomas von Kummant – title and booklet illustrations
 Volker Beushausen – photography
 Thomas Bürgerle – artwork

References

2008 albums
Schandmaul albums